Basil Mitchell may refer to:

 Basil Mitchell (American football) (born 1975), former National Football League running back
 Basil Mitchell (academic) (1917–2011), British philosopher